Bratilë is a community in the Elbasan County, central Albania. At the 2015 local government reform it became part of the municipality Gramsh. The place is notable for a suggested power plant to be built on the river Devoll, which flows along the settlement.

References

Populated places in Gramsh, Elbasan
Villages in Elbasan County